Croxton is a village on the B5026 between Eccleshall and Loggerheads. Population details for the 2011 census can be found under Eccleshall. It is notable for having an old windmill. The village church is called St. Pauls.

Notable residents

Rev Francis Le Grix White (1819–1887) FRSE FGS geologist, was vicar of Croxton from 1857 to 1869.

See also
Listed buildings in Eccleshall
Yarnfield
Swynnerton

References

External links

Villages in Staffordshire
Eccleshall